José María Cabanillas (born 28 October 1892, date of death unknown) was a Spanish equestrian. He competed in two events at the 1928 Summer Olympics.

References

1892 births
Year of death missing
Spanish male equestrians
Olympic equestrians of Spain
Equestrians at the 1928 Summer Olympics
Sportspeople from Valencia